The Karnes Stone Barn, near Carbondale in Osage County, Kansas, was built in 1877.  It was listed on the National Register of Historic Places in 2004.

It was built for George R. Bronson, a circus man.

It apparently was originally built to hold a circus;  it was later used as a milking barn.

References

Barns on the National Register of Historic Places in Kansas
Buildings and structures completed in 1877
Osage County, Kansas
1877 establishments in Kansas